Mammillaria mathildae is a species of plant in the family Cactaceae. It is endemic to Querétaro, México. Its natural habitat is hot deserts. It is of IUCN Red List Vulnerable status and threatened by habitat loss.

References

mathildae
Cacti of Mexico
Flora of Querétaro
Endemic flora of Mexico
Vulnerable plants
Taxonomy articles created by Polbot
Plants described in 1973